Under Dutch law, a samenlevingscontract is a written agreement loosely translated as "cohabitation agreement". It has been compared to marriage, but merely governs the so-called property relationships between two or more persons who are cohabiting. It does not necessarily imply a marriage-like (or sexual) relationship exists, but the contract can include agreements about any children within the cohabitation arrangement.

The only two requirements set by Dutch law are that the contract needs to be a notarial deed (made by a Dutch civil-law notary) and that the couple must agree to take care of each other financially.

Since the 1980s the contract has been popular among two different groups in Dutch society: people who wanted to formalise their relationship, but did not want to marry, and people who wanted to marry but could not legally do so. With the introduction first of registered partnerships (1998) and later the broadening of marriage to include same-sex couples (2001) in the Netherlands, the need for a cohabitation agreement for the latter has become less pronounced.

See also
 Same-sex marriage in the Netherlands

References

Law of the Netherlands
Society of the Netherlands
Contract law